Velvalee Dickinson (October 12, 1893 – ca 1980), was convicted of espionage against the United States on behalf of Japan during World War II. Known as the "Doll Woman", she used her business in New York City to send information on the United States Navy to contacts in Argentina via steganographic messages. She was finally caught when one of her contacts in Buenos Aires moved and her messages were returned.

Early life and career
Born as Velvalee Malvena Blucher in Sacramento, California to Otto and Elizabeth Blucher (or Blueher). She graduated from Stanford University in 1918 but did not receive her Bachelor of Arts degree until January 1937, allegedly because she had not returned books owned by the university.

In the late 1920s to the mid-1930s, Dickinson was employed in a brokerage company in San Francisco, California, owned by her future husband, Lee T. Dickinson. Shortly after her marriage, Dickinson worked as a social worker in the area until 1937. The firm did business with Japanese people and the Dickinsons' interest in Japan grew so much that they joined the Japanese-American Society, where they began to rub shoulders with members of the Japanese consulate. The FBI later also determined that she had made frequent visits to the consulate, attended important social gatherings at which Japanese Navy members and other high Japanese government officials were present, and entertained many Japanese people in her home. When the brokerage firm's success suffered a downturn, so too did the Dickinsons' role as proponents of good Japanese-American relations.

In 1937, the Dickinsons moved to New York City, where she worked for a short time as a department store employee. On December 31, 1937, she began operating her own doll shop, first at her residence at 680 Madison Ave and  later at a separate store at 714 Madison Avenue, where she operated for several years until she moved the store down the block, to 718 Madison Avenue in October 1941. The Dickinson doll shop catered to affluent collectors throughout the United States and overseas interested in obtaining foreign, regional, and antique dolls. Lee Dickinson assisted his wife's business by handling the accounting until his death, on March 29, 1943.

Case
In February 1942, a letter was brought to the attention of the FBI, intercepted by wartime censors. The letter, supposedly from a woman in Portland, Oregon to a correspondent in Buenos Aires, discussed a "wonderful doll hospital" and noted that the writer had sent the correspondent "three Old English dolls" for repairs. The letter also mentioned "fish nets" and "balloons".   Elizebeth Friedman's cryptanalysis unit at US Coast Guard Headquarters in Washington examined the letter and broke the code, concluding that the "dolls" were actually three warships and that the "doll hospital" was a West Coast-based shipyard where repairs were made, while the "fishing nets" and "balloons" disclosed information about coastal defenses and other critical information on the West Coast.

Based on the above letter, the FBI initiated an espionage investigation. During that time, four more letters were sent to the same Buenos Aires address, a Señora Inés López de Molinali at 2563 O'Higgins Street. However, the letters were returned to sender, due to "address unknown"; these letters were delivered to postal authorities and in turn handed over to the FBI. The people whose names had appeared on the envelope as senders stated that while the letters contained information that was correct to their personal lives and hobbies, and that the signatures on stated letters resembled theirs, all four vehemently denied that they had sent any of the letters to the Argentine address.

One of the letters, supposedly sent by a Mary Wallace of Springfield, Ohio, did indicate her home address – 1808 E High Street – but had been postmarked in New York, a place she had never been. The letter, primarily discussing dolls, contained references to a "Mr. Shaw, who had been ill but would be back to work soon." The letter corresponded to information that the destroyer USS Shaw, which had been damaged in the Pearl Harbor attack, completed repairs on the West Coast and was soon to rejoin the Pacific Fleet.

Another letter, given to the FBI in August of that year and said to have been written by a woman in Colorado Springs, Colorado, was postmarked from Oakland, California. That letter, written in February, made reference to seven small dolls which the writer stated would be altered to look as though they were "seven real Chinese dolls", designed to mimic a family of parents, grandparents and three children. The FBI determined that the letter was written shortly after a convoy of ships had arrived at the Mare Island Naval Shipyard in Vallejo, California. The letter contained certain details about the ships, that if made public, would have been detrimental to the war effort.

The same woman also gave the FBI a letter returned to her by the Post Office earlier that month. The second letter, from May, and postmarked from Portland, Oregon, discussed the acquisition of a "Siamese Temple Dancer" doll. A portion of the letter read:

[I]t had been damaged, that is tore in the middle. But it is now repaired and I like it very much. I could not get a mate for this Siam dancer, so I am redressing just a small plain ordinary doll into a second Siam doll.

Cryptographers determined this to translate as, "I just secured information on an aircraft carrier warship, it had been damaged, that is torpedoed in the middle. But it is now repaired ... [t]hey could not get a mate for this so a plain ordinary warship is being converted into a second aircraft carrier ..." The information matched damage done to the aircraft carrier , which had seen repairs in the Puget Sound Naval Shipyard before being transferred to the Naval Base at San Diego, California.

A third letter, handed to the FBI by a woman in Spokane, Washington and bearing a postmark from Seattle made reference to a "German bisque doll, dressed in a hula grass skirt", sent to Seattle for repairs that would be completed sometime around the first week of February. Naval authorities confirmed to the FBI that a ship damaged at Pearl Harbor was in Puget Sound for repairs and would be completed around the time stated in the letter.

A forensics examination of all letters concerned confirmed that the signatures were forgeries, based on copies of the original signatures. The examination also indicated that while different typewriters were used to compose the letters, the typing characteristics indicated that the letters were composed by a single individual. The conclusion reached by the examiners was that the letters contained codetext conveying information on the US Navy's ships and their location, condition, repair and status, with emphasis on ships damaged at Pearl Harbor.

Investigation
The Colorado Springs woman pointed the FBI in the direction of Dickinson, the New York doll shop owner. She believed that Dickinson had forged her signature on one of the letters in vengeance, because the woman had been late in paying for some dolls that she had purchased from the Dickinson shop. Based on investigations with Wallace and the other woman involved, all agreed in their suspicion that Dickinson was the suspect; additionally, all four women had at one time corresponded with Dickinson regarding doll collecting. Typewritten letters between Dickinson and the women involved were identified by the FBI as having been used in the "Springfield" letter.

An investigation into Dickinson's background indicated her involvement with Japanese organizations while living in San Francisco, as well as that after moving to New York, she had visited the Nippon Club and the Japanese Institute in New York, become a friend of the Japanese Consul General and was an acquaintance of Ichiro Yokoyama, the Japanese Naval Attaché in Washington, D.C. Further investigation of the Dickinsons' activities from January to June 1942 (the time frame in which the letters were sent) revealed that the couple had visited those areas, staying in hotels near the cities in question. The FBI was also able to determine that typewriters owned and made available to guests were used to compose the letters sent to Argentina. Continuing investigations disclosed that Dickinson had borrowed money from banks and business associates in New York up until 1941; however, in 1943, she was reported to have had in her possession a large number of $100 bills, four of which were traced to Japanese official sources that had received the money prior to the war.

Based on the results of the investigation, FBI agents arrested Dickinson on January 21, 1944, in the bank vault where she kept her safe deposit box. The box contained $13,000 ($219,233.18 in 2022, adjusted for inflation) and was eventually traced to Japanese sources. A portion of the money had been in the hands of a Captain Yuzo Ishikawa of the Japanese Naval Inspector's Office in New York before being transferred to Dickinson.

Dickinson told the agents that the money in the safe deposit box had come from insurance companies, a savings account and her doll business, but in a subsequent interview, she claimed that she had found the money hidden in her husband's bed at the time of his death. She claimed that her husband had not told her the source of the money, but she believed that it could have come from the Japanese consulate in New York City.

Trial and conviction
On February 11, 1944, she was indicted by a Federal Grand Jury in the U.S. District Court for the Southern District of New York for violation of the censorship statutes, conviction of which could result in a maximum penalty of ten years in prison and a $10,000 fine. She pleaded not guilty and was held in lieu of $25,000 bail. A continuing investigation by the FBI resulted in a second indictment on May 5, this time on charges of violating espionage statutes, the Trading with the Enemy Act, and the censorship statutes, which carried a possible death sentence. She pleaded not guilty and was released on the same bail.

On July 28, 1944, a plea bargain was made between the U.S. Attorney's Office and Dickinson in which the espionage and Trade Act indictments were dismissed and she pleaded guilty to the censorship violation and agreed to furnish information in her possession concerning Japanese intelligence activities.

After pleading guilty, she admitted that she had typed the five forged letters addressed to Argentina, using correspondence with her customers to forge their signatures.

She claimed the information compiled in her letters was from asking innocent and unsuspecting citizens in Seattle and San Francisco near the location of the Navy yards there, as well as some details from personal observation. She stated that the letters transmitted information about ships damaged at Pearl Harbor and that the names of the dolls corresponded to a list that explained the type of ships involved. She furthermore stated that the code to be used in the letters, instructions for use of the code, and $25,000 in $100 bills had been passed to her husband by Yokoyama around November 26, 1941, in her doll store at 718 Madison Avenue for the purpose of supplying information to the Japanese. She repeated her claims that the money had been hidden in her husband's bed until his death.

However, an investigation by the FBI refuted those claims, disclosing that while Dickinson had been a friend of Yokoyama, her husband had never met him. It was also learned that a physical examination done on him at the time indicated that his mental faculties were impaired at the time of the supposed payment. Both a nurse and a maid employed by the Dickinsons at the time emphatically stated that no money had ever been concealed there.

Velvalee Dickinson appeared in court for sentencing on August 14, 1944. Upon sentencing, the court commented:
It is hard to believe that some people do not realize that our country is engaged in a life and death struggle. Any help given to the enemy means the death of American boys who are fighting for our national security. You, as a natural-born citizen, having a University education, and selling out to the Japanese, were certainly engaged in espionage. I think that you have been given every consideration by the Government. The indictment to which you have pleaded guilty is a serious matter. It borders close to treason. I, therefore, sentence you to the maximum penalty provided by the law, which is ten years and $10,000 fine.

Still maintaining her innocence and claiming that her husband had been the Japanese spy, Dickinson was imprisoned at the Federal Correctional Institution for Women (now the Alderson Federal Prison Camp) in Alderson, West Virginia. She was released with conditions on April 23, 1951.

After her release, she changed her name to Catherine Dickerson and maintained a friendship and secretarial relationship with Eunice Kennedy, attending her wedding in 1953.

See also 

 Elizebeth Smith Friedman

References

External links 
 FBI History – Velvalee Dickinson, the "Doll Woman"
 La signora delle bambole – da "Le più grandi spie del mondo"  Document is in Italian; Google translation is available here
 The Spy in the Doll Shop in Smithsonian Magazine
 50 Years Ago – July 1944 from Usenet

1893 births
1980s deaths
American people convicted of spying for Japan
American collaborators with Imperial Japan
American women civilians in World War II
Female wartime spies
Businesspeople from New York City
People from Sacramento, California
People convicted under the Espionage Act of 1917
Stanford University alumni
World War II spies for Japan